Turf Moor is an association football stadium in Burnley, Lancashire, England, which has been the home of Burnley F.C. since 1883. This unbroken service makes Turf Moor the second-longest continuously used ground in English professional football. The stadium is situated on Harry Potts Way, named after the manager who won the 1959–60 First Division with the club, and has a capacity of 21,944.

The Turf Moor site has been used for sporting activities since at least 1843, when Burnley Cricket Club moved to the area. In 1883, they invited Burnley F.C. to use a pitch adjacent to the cricket field. The first grandstand was not built until 1885, while terraces were also added to each end of the ground in the same year. Between the mid-1950s and mid-1970s, all stands were rebuilt. Turf Moor underwent further refurbishment during the 1990s, when the Longside and the Bee Hole End terraces were replaced by all-seater stands following the recommendations of the Taylor Report. The ground comprises four stands: the Bob Lord Stand, the Cricket Field Stand, the North Stand and the Jimmy McIlroy Stand.

In 1886, Turf Moor became the first football ground to be visited by a member of the Royal Family, when Prince Albert Victor attended a friendly match between Burnley and Bolton Wanderers. The first Football League match at the ground took place in October 1888; Fred Poland scored the first league goal at the stadium. In 1922, Turf Moor hosted its only FA Cup semi-final and, in 1927, it was the venue of an international match between England and Wales. The stadium's record attendance was set in 1924, when 54,775 people attended an FA Cup third round game between Burnley and Huddersfield Town.

History

Early years and construction
Burnley is in Lancashire in Northern England on the edge of the Pennines; its River Brun drains the moors to the east. During the Middle Ages, the Turf Moor area was one of the town's commons and the inhabitants probably cut turf here for fuel. Sport has been played at the Turf Moor site since at least 1843, when Burnley Cricket Club made the area their home. Before 1840, there was a short-lived attempt to host an annual horse (turf) race. In 1878, rugby football club Burnley Rovers played a side from Bacup in an evening match to demonstrate electric lighting. The pitch was surrounded by only three lamps which were powered by a small engine; the experiment cost £39 (the equivalent of £ as of ) but was unsuccessful as the darkness caused many spectators to leave early. In January 1883, the cricket club leased seven acres of land between the cricket field and Bee Hole Colliery to the east. The following month, they invited association football team Burnley to move from their original home at Calder Vale to the pitch adjacent to the cricket field. Burnley donated £65 (the equivalent of £ as of ) toward the setup costs. Burnley played their first match at Turf Moor on 17 February but lost 6–3 against Rawtenstall; according to a local newspaper, "a high wind made correct play impossible". Committee member Charles Riley subsequently appointed himself Turf Moor's first groundsman.

Attendances during the early years averaged around 2,000, although a crowd of 12,000 was at the ground in March 1884 to see Burnley play local rivals Padiham. Spectators had to congregate around the pitch or watch from the hill at the back of Turf Moor, so in 1885 the club built an 800-seater wooden grandstand along the south side of the ground, along Brunshaw Road (as it was then known), and installed uncovered standing areas (terraces) for 5,000 people at each end of the pitch. In that year, a dispute broke out as the cricketers complained that the footballers left the shared dressing room uncleaned and did not pay toward repairs. In October 1886, Turf Moor became the first football ground to be visited by a member of the Royal Family: Prince Albert Victor attended the friendly match between Burnley and Bolton Wanderers, while he was in the town to open a new hospital.

Turf Moor hosted its first Football League match on 6 October 1888—an encounter between Burnley and Bolton Wanderers. Burnley forward Fred Poland scored the first league goal at the ground after five minutes, and the team defeated Bolton 4–1. In 1889, after more disputes, Burnley separated from the cricket club and agreed to pay £77 per year (the equivalent of £ as of ) to rent the stadium, and subsequently increased their ticket prices from four to six pence (the equivalent of £ as of ) to the dissatisfaction of the supporters. In 1891, another local football team, Burnley Union Star, disbanded and abandoned their ground, which included a grandstand. Burnley bought the stand and moved it to the north side of Turf Moor, where it became known as the Stars Stand. Turf Moor hosted its first floodlit football match in March of the same year, between Burnley and Nelson; 16 creosote-fuelled lamps were placed on poles at intervals along the sides of the pitch. Spectators reported that while the edges of the field were sufficiently lit, there was a dark area in the centre.

The Stars Stand was demolished in 1898 and replaced by a larger grandstand, which continued to be referred to as the Stars Stand by the supporters. In 1903, Burnley built a second tier on the Brunshaw Road Stand to accommodate club offices, and in September of that year, the club hosted its first annual general meeting at Turf Moor. The Stars Stand was extended in 1909 with new turnstiles and barricades erected in preparation for the FA Cup quarter-final game against reigning Football League champions Manchester United. In 1911, the club unveiled plans for the rebuilding of the Brunshaw Road Stand; former Burnley forward Arthur Bell was the architect for the project. A strike amongst railway workers delayed the deliveries of steelwork for the new roof but spectators were still able to use the stand in time for Burnley's first league game of the 1911–12 season against Leeds City. Work on the dressing rooms had not been completed so players from both teams changed in the adjoining cricket pavilion. The stand cost the club £5,000 (the equivalent of £ as of ) and could accommodate over 5,500 spectators, including 2,200 seated places. By this time an L-shaped embankment had been constructed, possibly with spoil from the coal mine, stretching from the eastern goal around the northeast corner to the halfway line.

Development and decline

In 1913, the Burnley directors decided to demolish the Stars Stand for a second time and opted instead to expand the uncovered embankment. The Brunshaw Road Stand was also extended to run the whole length of the pitch. In 1914, a roof was constructed to cover the terracing at the Cricket Field End. The developments increased the ground's capacity to around 50,000, almost equal to the town's male population. Burnley won the FA Cup that same year, and they were crowned First Division champions in 1920–21. During that season, the team went unbeaten in 30 consecutive league matches—at that time an English record—and won 18 consecutive games at Turf Moor. The average home attendance was more than 30,000, a club record at the time. In 1922, Turf Moor hosted its only FA Cup semi-final; around 46,000 spectators saw Huddersfield Town defeat Notts County 3–1. On 23 February 1924, Burnley beat Huddersfield 1–0 in the FA Cup third round in front of 54,775 supporters, still the record for Turf Moor. As a result of the large crowd, one supporter lost his life in a human crush. Turf Moor hosted its only senior international fixture in 1927 when England played Wales. The Englishmen lost 2–1, as Burnley captain Jack Hill scored an own goal to give the visitors the win. In 1932, a hut and scoreboard were installed at the Bee Hole End embankment—named after the Bee Hole Colliery—with funds from Burnley's newly founded supporters' club.

In 1938, the club announced that a covered terrace would be built on the site of the old Stars Stand. The plan was delayed by the outbreak of the Second World War, but the new Longside terrace was eventually completed in 1954. Constructed on the four-decade-old embankment, the club spent £20,000 (the equivalent of £ as of ) on the roof alone.  The terrace was built with help from the Burnley youth players. In 1955, Burnley became one of the first clubs to set up a purpose-built training centre, on 80 acres of farmland at Gawthorpe Hall purchased by their new chairman, Bob Lord. The club installed permanent floodlights in 1957, which were first used during a friendly against local rivals Blackburn Rovers. Around this time, terracing was added to the banking at the Bee Hole End. As a result of Burnley's 1959–60 First Division title win, Turf Moor hosted its first ever European Cup match on 16 November 1960; Jimmy Robson and Jimmy McIlroy scored early in the first half as Burnley recorded a 2–0 victory over French team Stade de Reims. In 1969, the Cricket Field Stand was built at a cost of £180,000 (the equivalent of £ as of ) and incorporated the changing rooms, which made Turf Moor one of the few English grounds to have the players' tunnel behind one of the goals. It was the first stand to include oil-fired heating for supporters, with hot air blown through holes under the seats. The system was abandoned after two seasons due to the costs. The club also extended the open terrace at the Bee Hole End in 1970, with the aim of increasing its capacity to around 20,000.

Lord hired Cambridge Soil Services to re-lay the pitch in 1974, and to install new drainage technology and under-soil heating. Neither came into operation; Lord found them uneconomical, partly because of a major rise in oil prices. The pitch was also raised and the slope that had existed was minimised. Lord then replaced the Brunshaw Road Stand with a single-tier stand named after himself, which was opened in the same year by former prime minister Edward Heath. The Bob Lord Stand could accommodate 2,500 supporters; it cost £450,000 (the equivalent of £ as of ), which was partly financed by Martin Dobson's transfer to Everton and caused some fans to dub it the "Martin Dobson Stand". In 1978, Scottish club Celtic visited Turf Moor for the Anglo-Scottish Cup quarter-final first leg match. The Celtic fans rioted and hurled bottles, stones and iron railings; 60 supporters were injured. Burnley won the game 1–0 and defeated the Scots 2–1 in the return leg; the team won 3–1 on aggregate and went on to win that year's cup final.

A drop in home attendances combined with increased debt caused a rapid decline in the team's fortunes between the late 1970s and the early 1990s. Burnley were left with little money to invest in the stadium's redevelopment and safety work. In 1992, 17-year-old apprentice footballer Ben Lee was killed when he fell through the roof of the ageing Longside terrace as he tried to retrieve a football during training. The author Simon Inglis noted that the Longside "symbolised how far Turf Moor, once deemed to be so modern, had fallen behind".

Conversion to all-seater
 
Following the Hillsborough disaster in 1989, when a human crush on the terraces of the Hillsborough Stadium caused 97 fatalities, the Taylor Report was published in 1990. It proposed the introduction of all-seater stadiums in the top two divisions of English football by the start of the 1994–95 season. Burnley competed the 1994–95 season in the second tier, but were relegated to the third tier at the end of the year. As a result of their season at the second level, Burnley were granted £2.25 million (the equivalent of £ as of ) by the Football Trust in April 1995 to convert Turf Moor into an all-seater stadium, which had to be spent within 12 months. The club contracted the Lincolnshire-based Linpave company in September 1995 to build two stands in place of the Longside and the Bee Hole End terraces at a total cost of £5.2 million (the equivalent of £ as of ). The last match in front of the Longside was played on 16 September—Burnley won 2–1 against Hull City. The two-tiered North Stand was built in its place and was opened in April 1996 for the visit of Bristol Rovers. It was later renamed the James Hargreaves Stand due to a sponsorship deal. A day after the North Stand had opened, demolition of the Bee Hole End started. The Jimmy McIlroy Stand, named in honour of the former Burnley player, was completed in September 1996 and took the stadium's capacity to 22,619.

In 2006, Burnley sold Turf Moor and the Gawthorpe training ground to Longside Properties to resolve their financial problems following the 2002 ITV Digital collapse—Burnley lost over 30 per cent of their income due to the loss of expected television revenue. The club's chairman Barry Kilby owned 51 per cent of Longside Properties' shares. The following year, the club revealed plans for a £20 million (the equivalent of £ as of ) redevelopment of Turf Moor and Gawthorpe, to be carried out in six phases and expected to be completed by 2010. Among the ideas was the demolition of the Cricket Field and the construction of a stand that would incorporate a hotel, restaurant, business centre and cricket pavilion. Planning permission for the first stage of developments was granted in April 2008, but in October, the club delayed the project as a result of the global financial crisis. The plans were again put on hold in 2010, due to Burnley's relegation from the Premier League and a projected recession.

Turf Moor and Gawthorpe returned to Burnley ownership under co-chairmen John Banaszkiewicz and Mike Garlick in 2013, after support from private investors. Following promotion back to the Premier League in 2014, the players' tunnel was relocated to the corner between the James Hargreaves and the Cricket Field Stands. In 2016, a new club shop was built between the Jimmy McIlroy and Bob Lord Stands as part of an extension to the stadium. In 2019, the wooden seats in the Cricket Field's away section were replaced with plastic seating. The club also built two corner stands for disabled home supporters between the Jimmy McIlroy and both the James Hargreaves and Bob Lord Stands to meet the Accessible Stadium Guide regulations. In December 2020, American investment company ALK Capital acquired an 84% stake in Burnley for £170 million in a leveraged takeover. Under the new owners, the Preston-based ADI installed digital signage and large LED screens at Turf Moor in 2021.

Structure and facilities

Turf Moor's pitch measures  and is surrounded by four stands: the Bob Lord Stand, the Cricket Field Stand, the North Stand and the Jimmy McIlroy Stand. The two newest stands, the North and the Jimmy McIlroy, each have two tiers, while the Bob Lord and the Cricket Field are single-tiered. In 2010, Burnley installed a hybrid grass (Desso GrassMaster) pitch at a cost of £750,000 (the equivalent of £ as of ), which was funded by the revenue from their stay in the Premier League. It replaced the natural grass surface which often cut up during the winter months. The stadium has a capacity of 21,944, which is approximately one seat for every three inhabitants of the town—one of the highest ratios in English football.

The North Stand was constructed in 1996. It can accommodate around 8,000 spectators and runs parallel to the length of the pitch. The television gantry and the press box are both situated at the back of the North. The stand's suite has been licensed since 2005 to hold civil wedding services and it can also be used for banqueting events. The Jimmy McIlroy Stand was erected in 1996 and is situated at the eastern side of the pitch with an approximate capacity of 6,000. The North and Jimmy McIlroy Stands together house the stadium's corporate hospitality boxes. The Jimmy McIlroy's upper tier is the designated family area. A memorial garden is located behind the stand and includes a dugout replica with an image of former manager Brian Miller with his hands aloft, which was taken before Burnley's match against Orient in 1987; Burnley defeated their opponents in the final game of the season and avoided relegation from the Football League.

The Bob Lord Stand, constructed in 1974, has a capacity of around 4,000 and runs parallel with Harry Potts Way, named after Harry Potts, the manager who won the 1959–60 First Division with Burnley. It houses the club's trophy room as well as the directors' box and a corporate area. The Burnley club shop is located between the Bob Lord and Jimmy McIlroy Stands. The Cricket Field, opened in 1969, is Turf Moor's oldest stand. It houses home and away fans and has a capacity of around 4,000. The stand backs onto Burnley Cricket Club's pavilion and contains both teams' dressing rooms and the officials' lounge. Since the 2000s, the Cricket Field Stand has been renamed the David Fishwick Stand, the Ladbrokes Stand and the Barnfield Construction Stand for sponsorship reasons.

Burnley opened the world's first higher education institution with university degrees in the football and sports industry in 2011. It was named the University Campus of Football Business and was set up at Turf Moor. Other campus locations were later opened at Wembley Stadium, London, and at the City of Manchester Stadium, Manchester.

A popular drink served at Turf Moor since the First World War is "Béné & Hot"—the French liqueur Bénédictine topped up with hot water. The East Lancashire Regiment soldiers acquired a taste for the liqueur while stationed at the birthplace of the beverage in Fécamp, Normandy, during the war. They drank it with hot water to keep warm in the trenches, and the surviving soldiers later returned to the East Lancashire area with the liqueur. More than 30 bottles are sold at each game, which makes the club one of the world's biggest sellers of Bénédictine; Turf Moor is the only British football ground to sell it.

Other events and uses 
The stadium was used for a game between the Football League XI and the Scottish Football League XI in 1914; the Scots beat their English counterparts 3–2. The Football League team included Burnley players Teddy Hodgson, Eddie Mosscrop and Tommy Boyle; the latter scored from a penalty kick. In 1922, Turf Moor hosted its only FA Cup semi-final, and in 1927, the ground staged its only senior international fixture when England played Wales. England B and England's junior sides have also played at the stadium on several occasions, at under-21, under-20 and schoolboy levels. Turf Moor was one of the venues for the 1983 UEFA European Under-18 Championship and hosted the group stage match between Czechoslovakia and West Germany. The England women's team played their first match at Turf Moor in September 2003 against Australia, which was the stadium's first international women's game. The ground hosted several women's charity matches in the early 1920s; the first was in March 1920, when Dick Kerr's Ladies played Liverpool Ladies in aid of the National Association of Discharged Sailors and Soldiers.

Football clubs other than Burnley have played "home" matches at the ground. From 1902 to 1904, the club shared Turf Moor with Burnley Belvedere, members of the Lancashire Amateur League, as Burnley had financial difficulties. The FA Cup first round game between Accrington Stanley and Scunthorpe United in 1993 was held at the stadium. During the late 1980s, local club Colne Dynamoes were rapidly progressing through the English non-league system. Colne's chairman-manager, Graham White, had a proposal rejected by the Burnley board for a groundshare, and he even attempted to buy the club in 1989. The ground has also been used for other sporting activities than football, including an exhibition lacrosse match in 1912 and an American football game in 1987.

Records 
Turf Moor has been Burnley's home ground since 1883. This unbroken service makes the stadium the second-longest continuously used ground in English professional football, behind Preston North End's Deepdale. Burnley are one of the best supported sides in English football per capita, with average attendances of 20,000 in the Premier League in a town of approximately 73,000 inhabitants.

The highest attendance recorded at Turf Moor is 54,775 for a match against Huddersfield Town in the FA Cup third round on 23 February 1924. In an FA Cup fifth round replay game against Bradford City in 1960, there was an official attendance of 52,850. Some of the gates were broken down, and many uncounted fans went into the ground. The highest attendance at a league match is 52,869 against Blackpool in the First Division on 11 October 1947. The lowest attendance recorded is 400 for the Second Division fixtures against Barnsley and Gainsborough Trinity on 30 March 1901 and 8 March 1902, respectively. The highest seasonal average attendance for Burnley was 33,621 in the First Division in 1947–48, while the lowest average home attendance was 1,500 in 1902–03 in the Second Division.

Transport
The ground sits adjacent to the A671 and A6114 roads, and near to the M65 motorway. As most of the stadium's surrounding streets have parking restrictions on matchday, away supporters are advised to park at the cricket club or to use the car parks in the area. The closest railway station to the ground is Burnley Manchester Road, which is a 15-minute walk from Turf Moor. The other train station is Burnley Central, which is a 20-minute walk away and is mainly served by local trains. The Burnley bus station is relatively close to the ground; a bus ride to Turf Moor takes about five minutes.

Notes

References
Citations

Sources

External links
 

Buildings and structures in Burnley
Burnley F.C.
Football venues in England
Premier League venues
English Football League venues
Sports venues completed in 1883